'Closer Than Friends" is a 1988 single by Surface.  The single was the group first of four number ones on Hot Black Singles chart, staying at the top spot for two weeks, and peaking at number fifty seven on the Hot 100.

Cover Versions
 In 1997, Ms. Lydia remade the song, featuring Surface, the CD single peaked at number ninety-one on Hot R&B Singles chart.

References

1989 singles
1989 songs
Surface (band) songs
Songs written by Bernard Jackson (singer)